St. Demetrius' Church is a church in Boboshticë, Korçë County, Albania. It is a Cultural Monument of Albania.

References

Cultural Monuments of Albania
Churches in Korçë County
Boboshticë
Churches in Albania